Abdominal aura (also known as visceral aura and epigastric aura) is used to denote a type of somatosensory or somaesthetic aura that typically manifests itself as abdominal discomfort in the form of nausea, malaise, hunger, or pain.

Other presentations of the abdominal aura include viscerosensitive sensations such as abdominal discomfort, visceromotor symptoms presenting in the form of tachycardia, borborygmi or vomiting, and vegetative symptoms such as blushing and sweating. Pathophysiologically, the abdominal aura is associated with aberrant neuronal discharges in sensory cortical areas representing the abdominal viscera. Etiologically, it is associated primarily with paroxysmal neurological disorders such as migraine and epilepsy. The abdominal aura can be classified as a somatic or coenesthetic hallucination. The term is used in opposition to various terms denoting other types of somatosensory aura, notably splitting of the body image and paraesthesia.

Notes

somatosensory system
Medical signs
Symptoms and signs
Epilepsy
Migraine